Hwang Jung-lee (Korean: 황정리; born December 21, 1944), known to many with the spelling of Hwang Jang-lee is a Japanese-born Korean martial artist and actor. Hwang is perhaps best known for his role as "Thunderleg" in 1978's Drunken Master, "Sheng Kuan" in 1978's Snake in the Eagle's Shadow and Wong Chin in 1981's Hitman in the Hand of Buddha. Variations of his name include Wong Cheng-lee and Wong Cheng-li, in the Cantonese Chinese equivalents. His nicknames are Silver Fox (the name of his most popular movie character); "Thunderleg" and "Thunderfoot" (from his role in 1978 film Drunken Master).

Early life
Hwang was born in Aomori, Honshu Island, Japan to Korean parents. His family moved back to Korea when he was a baby.

Martial arts
Hwang took Taekwondo lessons from age 14 and achieved his 7th dan (rank) black belt. In 1965 at age 21, Hwang became a martial arts instructor for the Korean and South Vietnamese Armies, specializing in taekwondo. In January 2003, Hwang received his 9th dan black belt in taekwondo. In addition, he currently holds a 9th dan rank with the World Tang Soo Do General Federation.

Hwang still actively teaches martial arts. He is currently an instructor with the World Tang Soo Do General Federation and serves as Technical Advisor. He recently has completed a tour of the US and Canada in which he, along with other Korean Grandmasters, promoted the study and practice of traditional martial arts.

Career

Acting
Hwang began his acting career in Korean movies. In 1976, Ng See-yuen offered Hwang employment in Hong Kong, where he first appeared in Secret Rivals as the villain Silver Fox.  Hwang took the lead in many martial arts movies, usually playing an antagonist. Hwang's nicknames, "King of the Legfighters" and "Thunderleg" relate to his style of martial arts performance where he uses his legs in a particular way.

In the mid 1970s, Hwang performed in two Jackie Chan movies Snake in the Eagle's Shadow and Drunken Master. as "Sheng Kuan" and "Thunderfoot" ("Thunderleg"). In 2002, Mike Leeder, a writer and producer, interviewed Hwang for the "Contender films" Hong Kong Legends DVD range.

Directing
In 1981, Hwang directed his first movie, Hitman in the Hand of Buddha, and was credited as Wong Chin.

Other films and retirement from acting
In 1987, Hwang trained German actor Matthias Hues in preparation for his film debut as "Yuri, the Russian" in No Retreat, No Surrender 2. Cast at the suggestion of producer Roy Horan, who was also a student of Hwang's, Hues had no martial arts experience and trained in martial arts with Hwang. Hues enjoyed the experience so much that upon his arrival in Los Angeles, Hues would continue training in martial arts throughout his career. In the film, Hwang's opening scene, involving a firing squad, was cut from the U.S. version. Hwang would play Yuri's enforcer, General Ty, who engages in a brief fight against Cynthia Rothrock. 

In 1989, taekwondo grandmaster Jun Chong invited Hwang to come to the United States to appear as a villain in the film Street Soldiers. To bring an international flavor to the film, Hwang is credited in the film as "Jason Hwang", named after his son. In the early 1990s, Hwang returned to South Korea, where he ran a golf-tee manufacturing company and an hotel in Seoul. Later on, Hwang managed a bodyguard agency. Since then he has made only occasional film appearances, in movies such as Emperor of the Underworld (1994) and Boss (1996). In July 1996, Hwang retired from acting at the age of 51.

Return to acting
After a long absence from acting, Hwang appeared in the TV Series  The Return of Iljimae. Hwang featured in the documentary film, "The Anonymous King" in which Jon James Hodson examines Hwang's personal life in Seoul, Korea and Hong Kong.

Filmography

Movies

Director
 Hitman in the Hand of Buddha (1981)
 Canton Viper (1983)
 Not Again! (1990)
 Emperor of the Underworld (1994)

Documentaries
 Art of High Impact Kicking (1982)
 The Good Bad Boy (2014)

Television series
 Shaolin Temple (Taiwanese TV series) (1984)
 Mighty Weapon (1985)
 The Return of Iljimae (2009)

References

External links
 
 
 Hwang Jang-lee at Hong Kong Cinemagic
 French biography with movie reviews 
 Selective filmography
 Cineseoul profile
 Youtube Channel (취권 황정리 Hwang Junglee Drunkenmaster)

1944 births
Japanese male taekwondo practitioners
20th-century South Korean male actors
Living people
People from Osaka Prefecture
South Korean male taekwondo practitioners
Zainichi Korean people
South Korean male television actors
South Korean male film actors